Luigi de' Medici (22 April 1759 - 25 January 1830) was an Italian nobleman, legal scholar, diplomat and statesman, who served as Prime minister of the Kingdom of the Two Sicilies and the legal representative at the Congress of Vienna.

Early life 
He belonged to the Neapolitan branch of the princely Florentine House of Medici, a cadet branch founded in 1567 by Bernadetto de' Medici after he acquired the vast fief of Ottaviano. Luigi was born as a younger son of Michele de' Medici (fifth Prince of Ottaviano and fifth Duke of Sarno) (1719-1770) and his wife Carmela Filomarino (1725-1805).

Biography 
Luigi de' Medici lived and worked through some of the most tumultuous periods of the Kingdom of Naples: straddling the final stages of the reactionary reforms of Sir John Acton; the short-lived Parthenopean Republic proclaimed in Naples by Napoleon in 1799; the Sanfedismo (its fall); the retreat of the Bourbon court to Palermo under English protection after Napoleon took Naples a second time (1806); their restoration; and the eventual suppression of the Sicilian constitution and autonomy when the Kingdoms of Naples and Sicily were unified into the Kingdom of the Two Sicilies (1816).

References

Politicians of the Kingdom of the Two Sicilies
Prime ministers of the Kingdom of the Two Sicilies
1759 births
1830 deaths
18th-century Neapolitan people
19th-century Neapolitan people
Luigi
Knights of the Golden Fleece of Spain
Participants to the Congress of Vienna